Gerevich is a Hungarian surname. People with the surname include:

 Aladár Gerevich (1910–1991), Hungarian fencer
 András Gerevich (born 1976), Hungarian poet and academic
 Gyöngyi Bardi-Gerevich (born 1958), Hungarian volleyball player
 Pál Gerevich (born 1948), Hungarian fencer

Surnames of Hungarian origin